Triommatodes is a genus of moths of the family Noctuidae. The genus was described by Warren in 1889.

The Global Lepidoptera Names Index considers this name to be a synonym of Manbuta Walker, 1865.

Species
Triommatodes aberrans Schaus, 1914 French Guiana
Triommatodes adversa Dognin, 1912 Guyana
Triommatodes aequalipunctata Dognin, 1912 French Guiana
Triommatodes agenor Schaus, 1914 Guyana
Triommatodes angulata Schaus, 1906 French Guiana
Triommatodes belus Schaus, 1914 French Guiana
Triommatodes canidia Schaus, 1914 French Guiana
Triommatodes castigata Dognin, 1912 Peru
Triommatodes costinotata Dognin, 1912 French Guiana
Triommatodes madrina Schaus, 1901 Mexico
Triommatodes mapiriensis Dognin, 1912 Bolivia
Triommatodes padrina Schaus, 1901 Brazil (São Paulo)
Triommatodes plumosa Warren, 1889 Brazil (Amazonas)
Triommatodes pygmalion Schaus, 1914 French Guiana
Triommatodes pylades Schaus, 1914 Guyana
Triommatodes subrita Schaus, 1901 Brazil (São Paulo)

References

Calpinae